Tampere University of Applied Sciences (TAMK) is a university of applied sciences (a polytechnic) in the region of Pirkanmaa, Finland. Together with Tampere University, TAMK constitutes the Tampere higher education community.

Founded in 1996, TAMK merged with the Pirkanmaa University of Applied Sciences in 2010. Its campuses are located in Tampere, Ikaalinen, Mänttä-Vilppula and Virrat.

There are three other smaller campuses in Tampere: Mediapolis, Music Academy, and Proakatemia.

TAMK has almost 10,000 students divided among over 40 degree programmes, of which seven are conducted in English.

Schools 
TAMK comprises five schools:

 School of Built Environment and Bioeconomy
 School of Business and Media
 School of Industrial Engineering
School of Pedagogic Innovations and Culture
School of Social Services and Health Care

Academic collaboration
TAMK has collaborations with more than 300 universities in fifty countries, including with the Shahjalal University of Science and Technology in Bangladesh. TAMK takes part in several mobility programmes, including Erasmus +, Nordplus, North-South-South, First, the China Programme for Educational Cooperation, and Science Without Borders.

References

External links
Official website

 

Universities and colleges in Finland
Educational institutions established in 1996
Education in Tampere
1996 establishments in Finland